Magellanic may refer to:
Magellanic Steppe, 7th largest desert in the world, see Patagonian Desert
Magellanic Straits, a sea passageway at the tip of South America, see Strait of Magellan
Magellanic subpolar forests, an ecoregion of southernmost Chile and Argentina
Magellanic Premium, a major prize established in 1786 regarding navigation

Astronomy
Magellanic Clouds, two major Milky Way neighbouring galaxies, matter streams, or systems related to them:
Large Magellanic Cloud, a major satellite galaxy to the Milky Way
Small Magellanic Cloud, a smaller major satellite galaxy to the Milky Way
Mini Magellanic Cloud, a sub-satellite galaxy separating from the Small Magellanic Cloud
Magellanic Bridge, a neutral hydrogen stream with a few stars linking the two Magellanic Clouds, with a density of stars midway known as OGLE Island
Magellanic Stream, a neutral hydrogen gas halo and star envelope around the two Magellanic Clouds linking them to the Milky Way
Magellanic spiral, a type of small galaxy
Magellanic Catalogue of Stars

Biology
Magellanic horned owl, a large owl south of the central Andes, see Lesser horned owl
Magellanic Long-clawed Mouse, also known as the Magellanic long-clawed akodont, see Chelemys delfini
Magellanic penguin, a South American bird
Magellanic plover, a wader shorebird in the extreme south of Argentina
Magellanic rockcod, a species of cod icefish, see Maori cod
Magellanic tuco-tuco, a South American rodent
Magellanic woodpecker, a South American bird

Science fiction 
The Magellanic Cloud, an English variant title of Obłok Magellana, a 1955 Polish science fiction novel by Stanislaw Lem
The Magellanics, a science fiction novella by Alfred Coppel appearing in the Winter 1952 issue of Two Complete Science-Adventure Books
The Horror from the Magellanic, a science fiction novelette appearing in the May 1969 issue of Amazing Stories by Edmond Hamilton

Miscellaneous 
Swedish Magellanic Expedition, a scientific expedition (1907–09)

See also
Magellan (disambiguation)